For the former TV station, see WUPX-TV

WAOM is a Christian radio station licensed to Mowrystown, Ohio, broadcasting on 90.5 MHz FM.  WAOM is an affiliate of Radio 74 Internationale and is owned by God's Final Call & Warning, Inc.

References

External links
Radio 74's website
God's Final Call and Warning's website

AOM
Radio 74 Internationale radio stations
2018 establishments in Ohio
Radio stations established in 2018